Mark Victor Arbib (born 9 November 1971) is an Australian former Labor Party politician and trade unionist, who was an Australian Senator for New South Wales from 2008 to 2012.

Arbib rose within the New South Wales Labor Party, and was eventually elected as State Secretary in 2004, before being elected to the Senate at the 2007 election. Arbib was frequently described in the media as a "power-broker" within the Parliamentary Labor Party. In 2009, he was appointed to the Cabinet as Minister for Employment Participation.

In 2010, he was instrumental in the successful leadership challenge by Deputy Prime Minister Julia Gillard to Prime Minister Kevin Rudd. Gillard later named Arbib as Minister for Sport and Minister for Social Housing and Homelessness. After Rudd launched a leadership challenge against Gillard in 2012, Arbib announced his immediate retirement from politics.

Arbib was subsequently appointed a senior executive with James Packer's private investment company, Consolidated Press Holdings. He was also made President of Athletics Australia and has previously been a board member of the South Sydney Rabbitohs and for Sydney FC.

Personal
Arbib was born in the Sydney suburb of Chippendale. His father, Eric Arbib, was of Libyan heritage and spoke Italian, moving to Australia in the 1960s and becoming a property developer. His mother, Lola, was born in Sydney. She raised Mark and his brother Scott after the death of their father when they were young. He has a Master of Arts in political science and economic history from the University of New South Wales.

He lives in Sydney with his wife Kelli Field and two daughters. He is a supporter of the Sydney Roosters NRL club, Sydney FC A-League club, and is a public Ambassador for Australia's leading Indigenous non-profit education organisation, the Australian Indigenous Education Foundation.

Arbib is an avid runner, having completed a number of Ironman triathlons and marathons. His personal best times are 11.09 for the Melbourne Ironman and 2.58.51 for the Sydney Marathon.

Early career
While studying, Arbib worked part-time at a Sizzler restaurant in Bondi Junction. When there were moves to remove penalty rates, he negotiated on behalf of the part-time workers and signed up members to the Liquor Trades Union. Later he worked variously as a metal trades assistant, beach inspector and restaurant cook, but became increasingly involved in the trade union movement. In 1989 he had a bit part in the Australian soap opera Home and Away.

He joined the Australian Labor Party in 1992 and was elected as President of NSW Young Labor in 1995. He served as Assistant General Secretary from 1999 and was the ALP State Organiser between 1996 and 1999.

Career as General Secretary
Arbib was elected General Secretary of the Australian Labor Party (NSW Branch) in June 2004. In 2005, he was elevated to the role of national convener of the party's right wing.

In 2007, Arbib was Campaign Director for Morris Iemma's successful 2007 state election campaign. Following the 2007 Election victory for the Labor Party, he was credited by former premier Bob Carr as "one of the best campaigners in the business." However, the opposition has criticised his role in procuring political donations for the Labor party from business groups.

In January 2008, The Sydney Morning Herald quoted an organisation which makes political donations to the Labor Party as saying that Mark Arbib made an art form out of extracting political donations from businesses. Said the donor: "There's no doubt Arbib wrote the book in terms of both political donations ... and their importance ... It's fine to take the higher ground and say 'we won't make donations' ... but if you don't you have got zero chance of getting (to see them)." Arbib denied the allegations. Arbib was named in the ABC television program Four Corners in relation to political donations to the NSW Labor Party.

Arbib was preselected for the number one position of Labor's New South Wales Senate ticket and won a seat at the 2007 federal election.

Federal politics
From 1 July 2008 to 30 March 2009, Arbib served on the Senate Committees for Foreign Affairs, Defence and Trade, Corporations and Financial Services, and Education, Employment and Workplace Relations. He was also the co-convenor of a bipartisan parliamentary group: Parliamentarians Against Child Abuse and Neglect (PACAN) and is an Ambassador of the Australian Indigenous Education Foundation.

Arbib was a member of the ALP National Executive (from 2004) and a member of the ALP National Executive Committee (from 2007). In February 2009, he was appointed Parliamentary Secretary for Government Service Delivery.

In the June 2009 reshuffle, he was promoted to Employment Participation Minister and Minister Assisting the Prime Minister on Government Service Delivery.

On 24 June 2010, Arbib used his power as leader of the NSW right faction to shore up numbers to depose Kevin Rudd, then in his first term as Prime Minister, in favour of Julia Gillard.
In August 2010 Arbib stood down from the ALP National Executive to concentrate on his portfolio duties. In November 2010 Arbib was the first Federal Labor Party front bencher to support same-sex marriage. He spoke in favour of marriage equality at Labor's National Conference in December 2011 and has called on the Liberal Party to allow its members a conscience vote.

As Minister for Sport, Arbib championed a National Policy on Match Fixing in Sport which included nationally consistent criminal legislation. Arbib argued match-fixing was a threat to the integrity of sport and called for jail time for those found guilty of engaging in serious match-fixing and for the formation of an international WADA-type body to combat match-fixing internationally. During his time as Minister for Sport, Arbib was also a Member of the World Anti-Doping Authority Foundation Board.

The United States diplomatic cables leaks revealed that Mark Arbib was in regular contact with staff at the US embassy in Canberra and provided them with inside information and commentary on the workings of the government and the Labor Party.
Arbib strongly denied having a special relationship with the United States and was highly critical of Fairfax's reporting of the cables which he claims contained a number of serious factual errors.

In the December 2011 reshuffle, Arbib was appointed as Assistant Treasurer, Minister for Small Business and Manager of Government Business in the Senate.

On 27 February 2012, hours after the ALP leadership ballot, Arbib announced his resignation from the Cabinet from 2 March, and his intention to also resign from the Senate. He cited wanting to spend more time with his family than being a Minister and Senator can allow. He also hoped his resigning would help the Labor Party to heal. His resignation from the Senate was submitted on 5 March. The following day on 6 March 2012, Arbib was replaced as a Senator by former Premier of New South Wales Bob Carr, who on 13 March became the Foreign Minister following the resignation of Kevin Rudd from that position.

Post politics
In June 2012, Arbib became director of strategy and business development at Consolidated Press Holdings, the private investment company of James Packer, whom Arbib had helped during his time in politics.

Arbib also represented Consolidated Press Holdings on the board of the South Sydney Rabbitohs, and was a board member of the Packer Family Foundation which, in July 2014, announced a $200 million national philanthropic fund in partnership with the Crown Resorts Foundation.

Sporting and philanthropic roles

Following his role as Federal Minister for Sport, Arbib has gone on to serve in a number of roles with major sporting organisations. In April 2012 Australian Rugby Union (ARU) announced Arbib would conduct a major review into ARU's corporate governance. The review followed the decision of other major sports, including the Australian Rugby League Commission, Cricket Australia and Football Federation Australia, to review their governance structures.

The recommendations contained in Strengthening the Governance of Australian Rugby (the Arbib Review), were endorsed in full by the Board of ARU in October 2012. On 10 December 2012, ARU's State and Territory Member Unions voted in favour of a new constitution adopting Arbib's recommendations. The changes from the Arbib Review established an Independent Board of Directors and reformed the Membership of ARU to better reflect the Rugby Union community across Australia, both amateur and professional.

In May 2012 it was also announced that Arbib would join the board of Sydney FC, one of the A League's most successful football clubs.

Arbib stepped down from Sydney FC in April 2016 to take up a new role as President of Athletics Australia after having been unanimously appointed to the position by his fellow directors. In his role as president, Arbib is looking to increase the reach and exposure of Athletics, including by making the sport more attractive to broadcasters. Arbib is also a board member of the professional Rugby League Team the South Sydney Rabbitohs, winners of the 2014 Premiership.

Arbib is an active supporter of a number of philanthropies. In particular, he is an Ambassador for the Indigenous Marathon Project and for Australia's leading Indigenous non-profit education organisation, the Australian Indigenous Education Foundation.

In October 2016, he was elected to the Australian Olympic Committee Board.

See also
 First Rudd Ministry
 First Gillard Ministry
 Second Gillard Ministry

References

External links
 Parliamentary biography

1971 births
Living people
Australian Labor Party members of the Parliament of Australia
Labor Right politicians
Members of the Australian Senate for New South Wales
Members of the Australian Senate
Politicians from Sydney
University of New South Wales alumni
Australian trade unionists
Australian people of Libyan descent
21st-century Australian politicians
Government ministers of Australia
Australian Labor Party officials